Nuea phat phrik is often translated as Thai pepper steak or fried hot and spicy meat. It is a Thai dish of beef fried with chili peppers and herbs. It is a stir-fried dish that includes shallots, garlic, hot chili peppers, bamboo shoots, green onions, mint and basil leaves, soy, fish and oyster sauces, and palm sugar.

Thai cuisine